Eksali forest land or Eksali plots are areas designated for shifting cultivation in the forest areas of the Thane and Raigad districts of  Maharashtra state, India. Separate Eksali plots working circle are carved in the working plan for the management of these forest lands. Before independence in the British Raj, Eksali plots were provided for cultivation with the objective of encouraging human habitation in outlying forest areas to supply labourers for forest works including the felling of trees, raising of plant nurseries, planting saplings, nurturing the tree plantations and protecting the forests. Though these lands were marked on the forest maps due to the Indian Forest (conservation) Act, 1980, it was not possible to permanently allot the land to the cultivator until the declaration of the Scheduled Tribes and Other Traditional Forest Dwellers (Recognition of Forest Rights) Act, 2006. This second act made it possible to allot the lands to the tribal landless cultivators holding the plots in forest areas. While the ownership of Dali land was collective, the ownership of Eksali forest land was individual and enabled allotments.

References

External links
Forestry Research Institute, India

Forestry in India
Government of Maharashtra
State forest departments of India
Wildlife conservation in India